A Comfortable Man is the debut studio album by British singer-songwriter and multi-instrumentalist Cathal Smyth. It was produced by Charlie Andrew and Kirsty Mangan. The album was first made available in 2014 as a vinyl LP, limited to 1,000 copies and sold during Smyth's three night performance at Wilton's Music Hall. It was given a full release by the Phoenix Rising Recording Co. in 2015, reaching No. 68 on the UK Albums Chart and No. 10 on the Independent Albums Chart.

Many tracks on A Comfortable Man were written following the breakdown of Smyth's 28-year marriage in 2005. After completing the recording of the album, Smyth departed Madness to embark on his solo career. Speaking of the album to the BBC in 2015, Smyth said: "The cycle of songs started with "Are the Children Happy?" and "Love Song No. 7". It was a very emotional time, it was a very cathartic act writing those songs. I decided I wanted to sit on them for some time to let the dust settle. When you're in Madness and you're writing, it keeps you occupied. It's [was] a very personal project on the sidelines. And I always think timing is essential and when it feels right."

A music video for "You're Not Alone" was released in September 2014. The song was released as a download single in March 2015, followed by "Do You Believe in Love?" and "Are the Children Happy?".

Critical reception

Upon release, Tony Clayton-Lea of The Irish Times stated: "A Comfortable Man is a cathartic exercise. Smyth has taken the opportunity to lay bare his thoughts about personal matters across a sequence of gently wrought, beautifully orchestrated balladic pop songs with rather morose titles." The Times picked A Comfortable Man as their album of the week and commented: "Smyth's simple, honest lyrics and straightforward delivery mean that songs such as "Are the Children Happy?" make a real emotional connection with the listener, while his gift for a pop melody allows for light relief on the upbeat numbers."

Mojo wrote: "...the musical document of his journey is appropriately desolate but altogether rather moving. Essentially it's Smyth playing Victorian parlour piano accompanied by mournful strings and celestial backing vocals." Uncut commented: "The LP springs to life when Smyth ignores the ponderous ballads and hits the pop jugular. "Do You Believe in Love?" and "She's Got the Light" are joyous naif: "Love Song No. 7" tugs effectively at the heart strings, while "Are the Children Happy?" is the most gut wrenchingly poignant divorce song you'll ever hear."

Track listing

Charts

Personnel
 Cathal Smyth – vocals, backing vocals

Production
 Charlie Andrew - producer, arranger, recording
 Kirsty Mangan - producer, arranger
 Alan Winstanley - mixing

References

2015 debut albums
Albums produced by Charlie Andrew
Chas Smash albums